Tobagonian English Creole is an English-based creole language and the generally spoken language in Tobago.  It is distinct from Trinidadian Creole and closer to other Lesser Antillean creoles.

See also
 Trinidadian English

References

Sources
 James, Winford, 2001 Di NAR Nuh Deh-een.
 James, Winford 2001, A Signature of Tobagonian Speech.

Languages of Trinidad and Tobago
Tobago
English-based pidgins and creoles
Languages of the African diaspora
Creoles of the Caribbean
English language in the Caribbean